ELV or ELVs may refer to:

Elfin Cove Seaplane Base, an airport in Alaska that has IATA code ELV
End of Life Vehicles Directive, a European Union directive to facilitate recycling and reuse of old automobiles (ELV means "End-of-Life Vehicles")
Ensemble de Lancement Vega, another designation for the ELA-1 launch pad
Ethel Lilian Voynich (1864–1960), known as ELV, Anglo-Irish novelist and musician
Expendable launch vehicle, a single-use space launch vehicle used in an expendable launch system
Experimental law variations, the so-called Stellenbosch Laws in rugby union
Extra-low voltage, an electrical standard designed to protect against electric shock

See also 
 Elf (disambiguation)